Solange Dudevant (13 September 1828 – 17 March 1899) was a French writer and novelist and the daughter of George Sand.

Biography
Solange Dudevant was born to author George Sand at Nohant on 13 September 1828. She was Sand's second child. Although Sand was married  to Casimir Dudevant at the time, Solange's father was rumored to be Stéphane de Grandsagne. 

In 1846 Solange became engaged to Fernand de Preaulx. But in 1847, she married the sculptor Auguste Clésinger, whom she met while posing for a bust. Solange was 19; the sculptor 32. The couple had a daughter, Jeanne, in 1848, but the child died a week after birth. A second daughter, also named Jeanne, was born in 1849. Nicknamed Nini, that child died in 1855 of Scarlet Fever.  

Under the name Solange Clésinger-Sand, she published her first novel, Jacques Bruneau, in 1870. Her second book, Carl Robert, was published in 1887.

She died on March 17, 1899, at her home in Paris and is buried in a private cemetery in Nohant-Vic.

Works
Jacques Bruneau, 1870
Carl Robert, 1887

References

1828 births
1899 deaths
19th-century French novelists
19th-century French women writers
French women novelists